Roszkowice  is a village in the administrative district of Gmina Bogdaniec, within Gorzów County, Lubusz Voivodeship, in western Poland.

The village has a population of 30.

References

Roszkowice